Lina Yegros (1914–1978) was a Spanish film actress.

Selected filmography
 Stowaway on Board (1941)
 The Hired Husband (1942)
 Lady in Ermine (1947)
 La Virgen gitana (1951)
 Vertigo (1951)
 Malvaloca (1954)
 Darling (1961)
 The Twin Girls (1963)

References

Bibliography 
 Bentley, Bernard. A Companion to Spanish Cinema. Boydell & Brewer 2008.

External links 
 

1914 births
1978 deaths
Spanish film actresses
People from Madrid